Hummelstown is a borough in Dauphin County, Pennsylvania, United States. The population was 4,535 as of the 2020 census. It is part of the Harrisburg–Carlisle Metropolitan Statistical Area.

Originally named Fredrickstown, the town was established in 1762. The current mayor is David Roeting. Hummelstown is a Tree City and is located in District 15 of the Pennsylvania State Senate. It is centrally located between Harrisburg and Hershey, making it a common tourist drive-through. It has several businesses and shops designed to capitalize on the tourist travel that passes through town.

History

Hummelstown was founded as "Fredrickstown" in 1762 by two Germans, Frederick and Rosina Hummel. They purchased the land for 200 pounds sterling, then divided the area into building lots, which were sold to German settlers. During the mid-19th century, the Union Canal along Swatara Creek was an important factor in the development of the local economy, promoting trade and transportation.

The town was located on the Berks-Dauphin Turnpike, and later it was served by the Union Canal which paralleled Swatara Creek bordering the north and the west sides of the town, and was opened in 1827. The Lebanon Valley Railroad arrived in 1858. This brought about many jobs of stone cutting and shipyard work and helped facilitate the Hummelstown Brownstone Company which became the leading employer of Hummelstown residents. The company mined Hummelstown brownstone at its quarries from 1867 until 1929. The company was the largest producer of brownstone on the East Coast.

Throughout the history of the town it has been a stopping point for tourists traveling to Harrisburg, the capital of Pennsylvania, or to Hershey, the home of Hershey Foods, Hersheypark, and Chocolate World. The Calder Cup has had several ceremonies conducted in Hummelstown over the years.

The borough celebrated its semiquincentennial or 250-year anniversary in 2012.

The Dr. William Henderson House, Keystone Hotel, Enoch Matlack House, and Zion Lutheran Church and Graveyard are listed on the National Register of Historic Places. The Hummelstown Historical Society building is located at North Rosanna Street and North Alley Street in the original building for the Zion Lutheran Church, which is now the main brownstone church on Main Street of Hummelstown. The society has a library, museum, and genealogy section, and hosts numerous Native American relics, such as arrowheads, bones, and pottery.

Hummelstown is within a thirty-minute drive of several colleges and educational institutions, such as HACC, Lebanon Valley College, Penn State Harrisburg, YTI Career Institute, Kepler Career Institute, and VoTech. Many residents of Hummelstown have jobs in Derry Township, mainly through Hershey Foods and its subsidiaries.

Hummelstown currently has three historical markers in the town, one for the town's oldest church, one for a former Revolutionary War gun factory, and the other for the Hummelstown Brownstone company.

Geography

Swatara Creek, a southward-flowing tributary of the Susquehanna River, forms the northern and western border of Hummelstown, and there is one unnamed pond by the Hummel Nature Trail east of the 7–11, at the end of town, next to the Tee Ball baseball field.

Climate
The climate of Hummelstown is similar to Harrisburg's.

Weather
Few tornadoes or hurricanes striking Hummelstown over the years. In 1992 the borough was hit by a bow tornado. In past years the town has been hit by only several hurricanes, the most severe being Hurricane Agnes which knocked out two key bridges in the town.

Hummelstown has had numerous blizzards. In 2004, a blizzard with  hit Hummelstown, and a blizzard hit Hummelstown in 2010 with a record-setting .

Highways
U.S. Route 322 skirts the south side of the borough as the Hummelstown Bypass. U.S. Route 422 branches off US 322 just east of the borough limits.

East of the center of Hummelstown, Main Street ends at the Boro Bar and Walton Avenue (previously Main Street) turns into and becomes PA Route 39/Hersheypark Road. At the west end of Hummelstown, Fiddlers Elbow Road crosses the US 322 bypass without access to it, then leads south  to the PA 283 expressway. Main Street, leaving Hummelstown to the west, joins U.S. Route 322. Going east Main Street turns into PA Route 39 at what part is known as Hersheypark Drive in Derry Township.

Demographics

According to the United States Census Bureau the median house value in Hummelstown is $99,400. Directly within the main limits of the town, excluding those of the development of Graystone, as well as those that have Hummelstown addresses, there is a total of 1,953 housing units.

Hummelstown is home to many older homes; a large number were built in the earlier decades of the 1900s.

According to the United States Census Bureau, the estimated upkeep cost and home improvement costs to percentage of house value in Hummelstown, has a median of less than 15% (which comes to a median cost of $14,910).

2000 census records
As of the census of 2000, there were 4,360 people, 1,879 households, and 1,200 families residing in the borough. The population density was 3,233.6 people per square mile (1,247.0/km2). There were 1,953 housing units at an average density of 1,448.4 per square mile (558.6/km2). The racial makeup of the borough was 97.02% White, 0.32% African American, 0.02% Native American, 1.06% Asian, 0.07% Pacific Islander, 0.67% from other races, and 0.85% from two or more races. Hispanic or Latino of any race were 1.51% of the population.

There were 1,879 households, out of which 29.3% had children under the age of 18 living with them, 49.1% were married couples living together, 10.5% had a female householder with no husband present, and 36.1% were non-families. 31.5% of all households were made up of individuals, and 12.3% had someone living alone who was 65 years of age or older. The average household size was 2.32 and the average family size was 2.91.

In the borough the population was spread out, with 23.6% under the age of 18, 7.4% from 18 to 24, 32.0% from 25 to 44, 21.1% from 45 to 64, and 15.9% who were 65 years of age or older. The median age was 38 years. For every 100 females there were 95.0 males. For every 100 females age 18 and over, there were 93.4 males.

The median income for a household in the borough was $41,625, and the median income for a family was $50,572. Males had a median income of $36,500 versus $27,547 for females. The per capita income for the borough was $21,394. About 4.2% of families and 6.7% of the population were below the poverty line, including 6.3% of those under age 18 and 7.2% of those age 65 or over.

Arts and culture

Annual cultural events
 The Lollipop Drop – New Year's Eve (discontinued)
 Movie Nights – at the Herbert A. Schaffner Memorial Park
 Taste of Hummelstown – food sampling by restaurants along the Main Street
 The Hummelstown Arts Festival – a non-profit annual arts festival held each September to raise money for scholarships for graduating seniors at Lower Dauphin High School continuing their education in the arts.
 Trick or Treat – Halloween is the night used for the annual Trick or Treat. Houses with their porchlight on from 6 pm until 8 pm are houses participating.

Borough of Hummelstown: Calendar of Events

Museums and other points of interest
Hummelstown has a historical society constructed with Hummelstown brownstone. The Hummelstown Historical Society is both a museum and visitor center. The town is home to a historical landmark, the Warwick Hotel, which is still a tavern reminiscent of its pre-Revolutionary War days. George Washington stayed a night there and drank from its bar.

Indian Echo Caverns, located one-half mile south of the borough limits, is one of the main attractions near Hummelstown. The caverns were originally used by the Susquehannock tribe, who lived and hunted in the nearby area until they vanished in the 1670s; it opened to the public in 1929.

The shortline Middletown and Hummelstown Railroad operates heritage and freight service between its namesake towns of Middletown and just south of Hummelstown proper, stopping in front of the Indian Echo Caverns entrance. The Hummelstown Borough Council has expressed concern around quality of life issues (noise, odor, safety) with having more trains passing through town. As such, trains stop just south of the busy four-lane U.S. Route 322 grade crossing on a regular basis, and are allowed to enter town exactly 12 times per year. Norfolk Southern's busy Harrisburg Line traverses the northern section of Hummelstown, with up to 20 lengthy freight trains passing through daily.

In the town
In the town there is an American Legion, a borough office building, and a post office. The legion and the post office are located on Walton Avenue (Main Street). The borough office building is located on South Hanover Street. The town has several bars, including the Warwick Hotel and Chicks. The town also has several churches, most located on Main Street.

The Hummelstown Chemical Fire Department occasionally serves as a distribution center for Potassium Iodide pills supplied by the Pennsylvania Department of Health. Hummelstown falls within a 10-mile radius of Three Mile Island.

Religion
As much of Pennsylvania, in the initial days of its founding, Hummelstown had a large base of Quakers. As the town grew, other Protestant denominations such as Lutheran, Methodist, and Presbyterian developed.

Parks and recreation

Several parks are located throughout the borough:

 Barry E. Mehaffie Memorial Park (formerly West End Park)
 Herbert A. Schaffner Memorial Park (formerly Borough Park)
 Hummel Nature Trail
 Marion F. Alexander Memorial Park
 Shope's Field

Education

Hummelstown is located in Lower Dauphin School District. Lower Dauphin High School, Lower Dauphin Middle School, Nye Elementary School, and the Price Building are located within the borough, as is the school district's administration building.

Libraries
Hummelstown's public library, the William H. and Marion C. Alexander Family Library, named for its major donors and local philanthropists, is located on the corner of 2nd and Railroad Streets.
HUM at a glance:
2,821 square feet of net space
27,456 volumes
Opened in 1953.
Building constructed in 1957 as Hummelstown Teen Center, later Hummelstown Civic Center.
Library moved into building in 1965.
Became part of the Dauphin County Library System in 1975. Library took over entire building in 1983. (This address is the current location of the library but the building info pertains to the former location across from the NYE Elementary School.)

Media
Hummelstown is home to The Sun newspaper, which covers Hummelstown, Hershey and Palmyra area (Lower Dauphin, Derry Township, Milton Hershey and Palmyra Area school districts). In early 2008, The Sun acquired the subscribers of the now-defunct Hershey Chronicle newspaper making The Sun the largest paid-circulation weekly in Dauphin County. The Sun began in 1871.

Other newspapers that cover Hummelstown include:
 The Patriot-News
 Central Penn Business Journal

Radio stations 
This is a list of FM stations in the greater Hummelstown, Pennsylvania, metropolitan area.

This is a list of AM stations in the Hummelstown, Pennsylvania, metropolitan area:

Folklore

There is a great history to the area, with its fields, creek, and the caves nearby. The biggest case of folklore around the town is the case of the sister and brother duo of William "Amos" Wilson and Elizabeth "Harriot" Wilson. William would later be known as "the Pennsylvania Hermit".

Notable people
 Kate Baer, poet
 Brian Baker, actor
 Terry Farrell, model and actress
 Bill Gaudette, soccer player for the New York Red Bulls
 Newt Gingrich, former Speaker of the House and presidential candidate, was raised by his mother and step-father on Main Street in an apartment above what is now a computer store. There is a tree on Main Street dedicated to his step-father as well as a plaque commemorating the site as their place of residence.
 George M. Leader, former governor of Pennsylvania
 Laurel Martin, field hockey player formerly for the US Olympic Team
 John D. Payne, Republican member of the US House of Representatives
 Alexander Ramsey, second governor of Minnesota
 William Simonton, Whig member of the US House of Representatives
 Bob Swank, head coach of the Buffalo State College football team
 William K. Thierfelder, psychologist
 Chris Villarrial, American football player, formerly for the Buffalo Bills and Chicago Bears
 James M. Wallace, member of the US House of Representatives
 Richard Winters, WWII veteran best known for his direction in "Band of Brothers"

Historic buildings and listings

 Dr. William Henderson House – 31 East Main Street
 Keystone Hotel – 40 East Main Street
 Enoch Matlack House – 250 East Main Street
 John Todd House – South Meadow Lane
 Zion Lutheran Church and Graveyard – Rosana Street, home of the Hummelstown Historical Society
 Brownstone Station - 320 E 2nd St

Native Americans
There were several Native American tribes located around Hummelstown, including the Susquehannocks, the Iroquois, and several smaller tribes that would later be conquered or assimilated into the Iroquois.

See also
 Hummelstown Brownstone
 Indian Echo Caverns
 List of museums in Pennsylvania
 List of towns and boroughs in Pennsylvania
 Middletown and Hummelstown Railroad

References

External links

 Borough website
 The Sun newspaper
 Indian Echo Caverns

Populated places established in 1762
Boroughs in Dauphin County, Pennsylvania
1874 establishments in Pennsylvania